Trace amines are an endogenous group of trace amine-associated receptor 1 (TAAR1) agonists – and hence, monoaminergic neuromodulators – that are structurally and metabolically related to classical monoamine neurotransmitters. Compared to the classical monoamines, they are present in trace concentrations.  They are distributed heterogeneously throughout the mammalian brain and peripheral nervous tissues and exhibit high rates of metabolism. Although they can be synthesized within parent monoamine neurotransmitter systems, there is evidence that suggests that some of them may comprise their own independent neurotransmitter systems.

They have well-characterized presynaptic amphetamine-like effects on these monoamine neurons via TAAR1 activation; specifically, by activating TAAR1 in neurons they promote the release and prevent reuptake of monoamine neurotransmitters from the synaptic cleft as well as inhibit neuronal firing. Phenethylamine and amphetamine possess analogous pharmacodynamics in human dopamine neurons, as both compounds induce efflux from vesicular monoamine transporter 2 (VMAT2) and activate TAAR1 with comparable efficacy. 

Like dopamine, norepinephrine, and serotonin, the trace amines have been implicated in a vast array of human disorders of affect and cognition, such as ADHD, depression and schizophrenia, among others. Trace aminergic hypo-function is particularly relevant to ADHD, since urinary and plasma phenethylamine concentrations are significantly lower in individuals with ADHD relative to controls and the two most commonly prescribed drugs for ADHD, amphetamine and methylphenidate, increase phenethylamine biosynthesis in treatment-responsive individuals with ADHD. A systematic review of ADHD biomarkers also indicated that urinary phenethylamine levels could be a diagnostic biomarker for ADHD.

List of trace amines 

The human trace amines include:
Phenethylamines (related to catecholamines):
 Phenethylamine (PEA)
 N-Methylphenethylamine (endogenous amphetamine isomer)
 Phenylethanolamine
 m-Tyramine
 p-Tyramine
 3-Methoxytyramine
 N-Methyltyramine
 m-Octopamine
 p-Octopamine
 Synephrine
Tryptamine

History

A thorough review of trace amine-associated receptors that discusses the historical evolution of this research particularly well is that of Grandy.

See also 
 Neurotransmitter
 Monoamine neurotransmitters
 Trace amine-associated receptor (TAAR)
 TAAR1

Notes

References

TAAR1 agonists

Amines
Amphetamine
Neurotransmitters
Neurochemistry